Franky So from North Carolina State University, NC was named Fellow of the Institute of Electrical and Electronics Engineers (IEEE) in 2012 for contributions to organic light emitting diodes.

References

Fellow Members of the IEEE
Living people
Year of birth missing (living people)
Place of birth missing (living people)
North Carolina State University faculty